Irma Sánchez (born 6 December 1987) is a Mexican professional boxer. She held the IBF female light flyweight title in 2011, the WBA interim female flyweight title in 2017 and challenged once for the WBC light flyweight title in 2010.

Professional career
Sánchez made her professional debut on 19 August 2006, scoring a fourth-round knockout over Ines Gonzalez in a scheduled four-round bout.

References

External links

Boxers from Jalisco
Mexican women boxers
Sportspeople from Guadalajara, Jalisco
Light-flyweight boxers
1987 births
Living people